Cryer & Sons or Cryer Boatworks was a wooden shipbuilding company in Oakland, California. To support the World War 2 demand for ships Cryer & Sons Company shipyard switched over to military construction and built: US Navy APC coastal transports. Cryer & Sons was started in 1907 by William Cryer, an migrant from England, in San Francisco.  William Cryer first boatyard was started 1890s. Cryer & Sons boatyard first boat opened in 1907 was located at 11th Avenue, Oakland. In 1912 he move the boatyard to 1890 Dennison Street Street, Oakland at the corner of Embarcadero. The boatyard was owned and run by William Cryer's son William James Cryer, and later by his grandsons William J, Cryer III and Robert R. Cryer. Cryer & Sons built and repaired wooden powerboats and began working on steel-hulled boats in the 1960s. Many of the boats built used engines from Atlas Gas Engine Company or Standard Gas Engine Company. There is a historical marker at 2301 Embarcadero, Oakland in Union Point Park, just south of the Coast Guard Island bridge near the waterfront remains.  The current site has been vacant since 1989. The main building was heavily damaged in a fire on the morning of November 13, 2020. The Cryer & Sons is and has been a site of contamination, some of the contaminated soil has been removed. Some of the land reclaimed has been used for the northern park of Union Point Park. This work has been done with the owners of the land, Measure DD, the city and the Port of Oakland. The City of Oakland had hoped to update the main Cryer & Sons building to use as a community center, but fire damage has ended that hope.

Notable ships: 
 Small, coastal transports for the US Navy.
 40 launches and Cannery tenders for the Alaska Packers' Association.
 The Black Swan a 130-foot yacht for Oakland automaker William C. Durant of Durant Motors.
 Concrete hulled 63-foot sailboat for Mayor John H. Reading in 1974.
 Thomas Crowley's Crowley Maritime tugboats
 Police patrol boat, like the 1908 San Francisco 50x10 Police patrol launch boat.

Small coastal transport
Cryer & Sons built troopships of the APc-1-class small coastal transports design. The crew was composed of 3 officers and 22 enlisted men and could transport up to 66 troops. The vessels had a large boom with a capacity of 3 tons. They were powered by one Atlas engine 6HM2124 diesel engine with a single propeller creating . For electrical they had two diesel 30 kW 120V D.C. service generators. The ship moved troops in the Pacific War.

See also
 Wooden boats of World War 2

References

American Theater of World War II
1940s in California
American boat builders